Hisanobu Watanabe (渡辺 久信 born August 2, 1965) nicknamed "Nabe-Q", is the former baseball player who played in the Japanese professional leagues from 1984 to 1998. He also was manager of the Saitama Seibu Lions for most of his pitching career with the Lions.

Career statistics
Bolded figures are league-leading.

Titles and Awards(NPB)
Wins Champion : 3 times (1986,1988,1990)
Winning Percentage Champion : Once (1986)
Strikeouts Champion : Once (1986)
Best Nine : Once (1986)
Golden Glove : Once (1990)
All Star game appearance : 6 times (1985–1986,1988–1990,1992)
No-hitter : Once (June 11, 1996)

External links

1965 births
Living people
Baseball people from Gunma Prefecture
Chiayi-Tainan Luka players
Japanese expatriate baseball players in Taiwan
Managers of baseball teams in Japan
Nippon Professional Baseball pitchers
Seibu Lions managers
Seibu Lions players
Yakult Swallows players